The Lut Desert, widely referred to as Dasht-e Lut ("Emptiness Plain"), is a large salt desert located in the provinces of Kerman and Sistan and Baluchestan, Iran. It is the world's 33rd-largest desert, and was included on UNESCO's World Heritage List on July 17, 2016. The name is derived from 'Lut' which means bare and empty in Persian and 'dasht' which means plain in Persian. The surface of its sand has been measured at temperatures as high as 70.7 °C (159.3 °F), making it one of the world's driest and hottest places.

Description

Iran is climatically part of the Afro-Asian belt of deserts, which stretches from Mauritania all the way to Mongolia. The patchy, elongated, light-colored feature in the foreground (parallel to the mountain range) is the northernmost of the Dasht dry lakes that stretch southward .

Iran's geography consists of a plateau surrounded by mountains and divided into drainage basins.

During the spring wet season, water briefly flows down from the Kerman mountains, but it soon dries up, leaving behind only rocks, sand, and salt.

The eastern part of Dasht-e Lut is a low plateau covered with salt flats. This area is also riddled with ravines and sinkholes.

Geology 
According to one study, more than half of the desert's surface is covered by volcanic rocks. Evaporites can be observed during hot periods.

Archaeology 
Around 2500 BC, a flourishing civilization existed in this area. The ancient city of Shahdad was located on the western edge of the Lut desert. And on the eastern side, there was a giant ancient city of Shahr-i-Sokhta.

The Lut area is an important region for Iranian archaeology. Recently, an extensive archaeological survey was conducted on the eastern flank of Kerman range and close to the western fringes of Lut Desert. As a result, eighty-seven ancient sites dating from the fifth millennium BC to the late Islamic era were identified. Twenty-three of these sites are assigned to the Chalcolithic period and Bronze Age.

Hottest land surface 

The Moderate-Resolution Imaging Spectroradiometer installed on NASA's Aqua satellite recorded that from 2003 to 2010 the hottest land surface on Earth is in Dasht-e Lut, with land surface temperatures reaching , though the air temperature is cooler. The precision of measurements is 0.5 K to 1 K. However, in 1972, the land surface at Furnace Creek at Death Valley, California, United States, reached .

According to a local legend, the name (Persian — "Toasted wheat") originates from an accident where a load of wheat was left in the desert which was then scorched by the heat in a few days.

See also
Dasht-e Kavir
Geography of Iran
International rankings of Iran

Further reading

Sykes, Percy. A History of Persia. Macmillan and Company: London (1921). pp. 60–62.

References

External links

 NASA image and info
 NASA survey on temperatures around the globe

Deserts of Iran
Ergs
Physiographic sections
Articles containing video clips
World Heritage Sites in Iran
de:Wüsten Afghanistans und des Iran#Lut